This is a list of Wikipedia articles on notable historical reenactment groups.

References